Samuel Isaac Betts (April 4, 1660 – May 31, 1733) was a deputy of the General Assembly of the Colony of Connecticut from Norwalk in the sessions of May 1693, and a member of the Connecticut House of Representatives in the session of May 1710.

He was the son of Thomas and Mary Raymond Betts, and the brother of Thomas Betts.

References 

1660 births
1733 deaths
Deputies of the Connecticut General Assembly (1662–1698)
Members of the Connecticut House of Representatives
Politicians from Norwalk, Connecticut